AIDAperla is a cruise ship of AIDA Cruises, which was built by Mitsubishi Shipbuilding at their shipyard in Nagasaki, Japan. The vessel was delivered  in May 2017 and was formally named in June 2017 by its godmother, German fashion model and television host Lena Gercke.

Design 
The vessel has deadweight of 9,200 DWT and gross tonnage of 125,572 GT. The cruise ship has 1,643 cabins and capacity for 3,286 passengers in double occupancy. AIDAperla has 16 passenger decks (of 18 total decks).

Engineering 
The cruise ship AIDAperla is driven by three Caterpillar 12VM43C diesel units, each with power of 12,670 hp. Additionally the ship has one dual-fuel Caterpillar 12VM46DF with power of 11,650 hp and generator Caterpillar 3516B with power of 2,250 kW. A 10 MWh battery is to be installed in 2020. The cruise ship operates with service speed of 22.5 kts.

References

External links

DNV GL: AIDAperla
Video of AIDAperla @ Marseille

Ships of AIDA Cruises
2016 ships
Ships built by Mitsubishi Heavy Industries